Charles Miles may refer to:
 Charles Miles (general), Australian Army officer
 Charles Miles (cricketer, born 1850), New Zealand cricketer
 Charles Miles (cricketer, born 1854), English cricketer and British Army officer
 Charles Oswald Miles, Anglican priest
 C. Austin Miles, American writer of gospel songs